Eastern Florida State College, formerly Brevard Community College, is a public college in Brevard County, Florida. It is a member of the Florida College System and has campuses in Cocoa, Melbourne, Palm Bay, and Titusville, as well as a Virtual Campus.

Since its inception, the college has served more than a half-million students. About 35,000 students take courses annually on the Titusville, Cocoa, Melbourne and Palm Bay campuses, and online. According to state Florida College System statistics, the college has among the top graduation rates in the 28-member Florida College System, and the highest graduation rate among state and community colleges in Central Florida.

In 2010, the college reported 25,000 students enrolled for courses. There were 1,200 employees in 2011, including support personnel and faculty.

History
In the fall of 1960, the Brevard County School Board founded Brevard Junior College with 768 students in the former Cocoa High School (built in 1925) on Forrest Avenue in Cocoa. Dr. J. Bruce Wilson was president. There were 31 faculty members. Four associate degrees were offered. The School Colors were Red-White-Blue and the School Mascot was a "Spartan".

At the time, it was racially segregated, and a separate Carver Junior College for African-American students was opened the same year. To accomplish desegregation in compliance with the law, Brevard Junior College merged with the all-black Carver Junior College  in 1963 and moved to the present location of the Cocoa Campus at 1519 Clearlake Rd in Cocoa. The college was renamed Brevard Community College in 1970 when the state of Florida created a system of two-year colleges. The college would then offer aeronautics specialities as it would be a foundation school for many NASA-tied universities such as Florida Institute of Technology and University of Central Florida. In 1966, the enrollment reached 4,335.

The college experienced a 51% increase in enrollment for online classes from 2007 to 2010.

On July 1, 2013, it was officially named Eastern Florida State College. It now offers four year degrees in health care management and general business management.

Academics

The college offers nearly 100 degree and certificate programs, including career and technical programs.

In 2009, there were 19.7 students per class on average.

Most of EFSC's students take part in its Associate in Arts transfer program. In 2007, EFSC was listed 21st in the nation in the number of AA degrees awarded. Transfer and articulation partnerships between EFSC and the University of Central Florida, a joint initiative called "DirectConnect," and with the Florida Institute of Technology, whose TechTrack program guarantees the admission of EFSC graduates who wish to transfer to Florida Tech, make possible the seamless transfer of credits to other four-year institutions. The EFSC-UCF partnership also involves the sharing of facilities and services with UCF on EFSC's campuses, including the EFSC/UCF Joint-Use Library.

Administration
The president's office is on the Melbourne campus. The Registrar's Office is on the Cocoa Campus with a main college mailing address for Eastern Florida State College of 1519 Clearlake Rd, Cocoa, FL, 32922. There are admissions and advising offices on each of the four campuses. The college is directed by a five-member Board of Trustees appointed by the Governor. The current chair is Alan H. Landman, a Melbourne attorney. James H. Richey is president of the college, named to that position in January 2012 after serving as interim president since October 2011. Richey also previously served as Executive Vice President and General Counsel.

Athletics
In the first year (1960–61), the school offered the men's sports of basketball and baseball as "club" teams. Over the next few years, they added wrestling, cross country, track and field, golf, tennis, archery, fencing, judo, and rifle. The school was a member of the Florida Athletic Conference and the NJCAA participating in the Southern Conference. The first basketball coach was Albert Green and the first baseball coach was George King. EFSC's athletic teams are nicknamed the Titans and participate in softball, baseball, women's basketball, men's basketball, men's golf, men's soccer, women's soccer, men's tennis, women's tennis, and women's volleyball. They participate in the Southern Conference of the Florida State College Activities Association (FSCAA) and the National Junior College Athletic Association Region 8. The men's golf program has won seven National Junior College Championships since 1969.

Other programs
The college include the Law Enforcement Academy which trains people for employment in local law enforcement positions. There are about 25–30 students.

EFSC is a direct connect satellite campus program to The University of Central Florida (UCF) in Orlando, Florida.

Cultural

The 2,000-seat Maxwell C. King Center for the Performing Arts, on the Melbourne campus, offers performances and cultural art events. The Astronaut Memorial Planetarium and Observatory, on the Cocoa campus, features one of the largest public-access 
telescopes in Florida as well as large-format movies, laser light shows, and other presentations.

The Titusville campus contains the John Henry Jones Gymnatorium, used for performing arts as well as athletic events. 

The Digital Media Bobcats have run the Independent Digital Features Festival since 2011, showcasing the talent of the Digital Media students.

WEFS TV is a non-commercial educational television station operated by EFSC. WEFS TV broadcasts educational, cultural, and informational materials and telecourses of special interest.

The Harry T. and Harriette Moore Multicultural Center commemorates the lives and work of the Moores, African-American community leaders who lived and worked in Brevard County, martyr-pioneers of the civil rights era.

Notable people

References

External links

 
Educational institutions established in 1960
Florida College System
Education in Brevard County, Florida
1960 establishments in Florida